DSCN is an abbreviation which may refer to -

Digital Still Capture Nikon
Data Set Change Notice (in UK National Health service), sometimes also DSC Notice
Deep Space Communications Network, more often Deep Space Network
Danish Society for the Conservation of Nature (Danmarks Naturfredningsforening)
Digital Scan (ASCII)
Dispersion-Strengthened Cupro-Nickel